Harry Michael Crawshaw (born 16 July 2003) is an English cricketer. He made his Twenty20 debut on 30 June 2021, for Durham in the 2021 T20 Blast.

References

External links
 

2003 births
Living people
English cricketers
Durham cricketers
Place of birth missing (living people)